US Valenciennes Olympic (or USVO, previously Union Sportive Valenciennes-Orchies) is a former French basketball team based in Valenciennes. It will be replaced by Union Hainaut Basket, because of the merging with Union Saint-Amand Porte du Hainaut (Saint-Amand-les-Eaux).

Notable players

  Nicole Antibe
  Isabelle Fijalkowski
  Edwige Lawson-Wade
  Jurgita Štreimikytė
  Teresa Edwards

References

External links
http://www.fibaeurope.com/cid_KNce8jInH7Qj1EsyH5rjn2.teamID_1240.compID_jr6ZiXqeGhMBtfq1yxqV83.season_2003.roundID_3556.html

Basketball teams in France